The 22679 / 80 Yesvantpur Junction - Hassan Intercity Express is a Superfast train belonging to Indian Railways South Western Railway zone that runs between  and  in India.

Coaches
The 22679 / 80 Yesvantpur Junction - Hassan Intercity Express has one AC chair car, 3 Chair car, 11 general unreserved & two generator car coaches . It does not carry a pantry car coach.

As is customary with most train services in India, coach composition may be amended at the discretion of Indian Railways depending on demand.

Service

Routing

Traction
A  based WDP-4, WDP-4D diesel locomotive pulls the train to its destination.

References

External links
22679 Intercity Express at India Rail Info
22680 Intercity Express at India Rail Info

Intercity Express (Indian Railways) trains
Rail transport in Karnataka
Transport in Bangalore